The 1984 Strongbow Welsh Professional Championship was a professional non-ranking snooker tournament, which took place between 7 and 11 March 1984 at the Ebbw Vale Leisure Centre in Ebbw Vale, Wales.

Doug Mountjoy won the tournament, defeating Cliff Wilson 9–3 in the final.

Main draw

References

Welsh Professional Championship
Welsh Professional Championship
Welsh Professional Championship
Welsh Professional Championship